South Russia or South of Russia was a short-lived military quasi-state that existed in Eastern Europe during the Southern Front of the Russian Civil War from 1919 to 1920.

South Russia was established on 8 January 1919 by the White movement after reorganization of their armed forces in the Southern Front, consisting of territory under their control in Ukraine, Crimea, Kuban, the North Caucasus, Black Earth region, Lower Volga, and the Don region. South Russia was an anti-Bolshevik military state under the Armed Forces of South Russia led by General Anton Denikin, and its borders were undefined, changing based on victories or defeats against the Red Army. In March 1920, Denikin established the South Russian Government in Novorossiysk, an attempt at a civil government with the General Command of the Armed Forces of South Russia serving as the legislative body. Less than a month later, the Whites were forced to evacuate from Novorossiysk, the Armed Forces of South Russia and the South Russian Government were dissolved. Denikin resigned and delegated power to General Pyotr Wrangel, who established the new Government of South Russia in Sevastopol and the new Russian Army, commonly known as the Army of Wrangel in April.

During mid-1920, South Russia's territory had receded to the White stronghold on Crimea, a highly defensible location that had repelled several Red offensives. The Whites were defeated at the Siege of Perekop in November 1920, losing the highly strategic Perekop Isthmus and leaving Crimea vulnerable to Red invasion. Wrangel ordered the evacuation of Crimea, effectively ending his government and the Southern Front in Red Victory. South Russia ceased to exist after the Red conquest of Crimea, and its territory was absorbed by Soviet Russia, the Ukrainian Soviet Socialist Republic, and the Black Army.

In Soviet historiography, South Russia was called the White South or White South of Russia, in reference to the concept of the White Army.

References

1919 establishments in Russia
1920 disestablishments in Russia
1920 disestablishments in Ukraine
Historical regions in Russia
Post–Russian Empire states
Russian rebels
Russian anti-communists
Rebellions in Ukraine
Southern Russia
States and territories established in 1919
States and territories disestablished in 1920
White movement